Acacia effusa is a shrub belonging to the genus Acacia and the subgenus Juliflorae that is endemic to north western Australia.

Description
It has grey to grey-red coloured minni ritchi style bark that peels backward in small rolls. The terete branchlets are matted with dense wolly hairs but become more glabrous as they mature. Like most species of Acacia it has phyllodes rather than true leaves. It blooms from May to August producing yellow flowers.

Taxonomy
The species was first formally described by the botanist Bruce Maslin in 1982 as part of the work Studies in the genus Acacia (Leguminosae: Mimosoideae). Acacia species of the Hamersley Range area, Western Australia as published in the journal Nuytsia. It was reclassified as Racosperma effusum by Leslie Pedley in 2003 then transferred back to genus Acacia in 2006.

Distribution
It is native to an area in the Pilbara region of Western Australia where it is often situated on scree slopes of low ranges growing in stony red loamy soils. It has a limited range mostly within the Hamersley Range National Park where it is considered to be abundant on the lower slopes where the watercourses exit the range.

See also
List of Acacia species

References

effusa
Acacias of Western Australia
Plants described in 1982
Taxa named by Bruce Maslin